LFP may refer to:

Places
 Lake Forest Park, Washington, USA; a city
 Little Five Points, a district of Atlanta, Georgia, USA

Groups, organizations, companies
 Labor–Farm Party of Wisconsin, former political party
 Larry Flynt Publications, American adult entertainment company and magazine publisher
 Library Freedom Project, a North American anti-surveillance advocacy group
 Liga Nacional de Fútbol Profesional, governing body of principal football leagues in Spain
 Ligue de Football Professionnel, governing body of principal football leagues in France
 Local Food Plus, a Canadian nonprofit organization 
 The London Free Press, a daily newspaper in London, Ontario
 Lycée Français de Prague, a French international school in Prague, Czech Republic

In mathematics, science, technology
 Least fixed point, in mathematics
 Light-field picture, a photograph taken by a light-field camera
 The file format used by Lytro light-field cameras.
 Lisp and Functional Programming, a conference in computer science that merged into the International Conference on Functional Programming in 1996
 Lithium iron phosphate, a compound used in lithium iron phosphate batteries (LFP batteries).
 Local field potential, in neuroscience and biochemistry, a measurement of cortical activity
 Large format printer, a digital printer usually up to 100" wide. Also known as wide-format printer

See also

 IFP (disambiguation)
 FP (disambiguation)